The magic wavelength (also known as a related quantity, magic frequency) is the wavelength of an optical lattice where the polarizabilities of two atomic clock states have the same value, such that the AC Stark shift caused by the laser intensity fluctuation has no effect on the transition frequency between the two clock states.

AC Stark shift by optical lattice
The laser field in an optical lattice induces an electric dipole moment in the atoms to exert forces on them and hence confine them. However, the difference in polarizabilities of the atomic states leads to an AC Stark shift in the transition frequency between the two states, a shift that is dependent on the laser optical intensity at the particular atom location in the lattice. When it comes to precise measurements of transition frequency such as atomic clocks, the temporal fluctuations of the laser optical intensity would then deteriorate the clock accuracy. Furthermore, due to the spatial variation of laser intensity in the lattice, the atom's motion within the lattice would also be coupled into the uncertainty of the internal transition frequency of the atom.

Polarizability depends on wavelength 
Despite having different function forms, the polarizabilities of two atomic states do have a dependency on the wavelength of the laser field. In some cases, it is then possible to find a particular wavelength at which the two atomic states happen to have exactly the same polarizability. This particular wavelength, where the AC Stark shift vanishes for the transition frequency, is called the magic wavelength, and the frequency that corresponds to this wavelength is called the magic frequency. This idea was first introduced by Hidetoshi Katori's calculation in 2003, and then experimentally achieved by Katori's group in 2005.

References

Physical quantities
Atomic clocks
Atomic physics